Rainbow Islands Evolution is a game in the Bubble Bobble series for the PSP system. It is an enhanced remake of the arcade game Rainbow Islands.

Bub and Bob, the two main characters in the series, are against an evil recording company that seeks to pollute the Rainbow Islands' atmosphere by creating constant musical noise, therefore wilting the flora and mutating the fauna. Bub and Bob use a hurdy-gurdy as a weapon to create the rainbows.

The game follows the same vertical-scrolling system from the original, but it expands to a third dimension as there are platforms in the background which become accessible through the course of the game.

Reception 

The game received "generally unfavorable reviews" according to the review aggregation website Metacritic. In Japan, Famitsu gave it a score of 16 out of 40.

References

2007 video games
Bubble Bobble
Majesco Entertainment games
Marvelous (company) games
Platform games
PlayStation Portable games
PlayStation Portable-only games
Taito games
Video game remakes
UTV Ignition Games games
Multiplayer and single-player video games
Video games developed in Japan
Red Ant Enterprises games